Cell Wall Protein 1 (CWP1) is a gene of Saccharomyces cerevisiae and the Saccharomyces cerevisiae-Saccharomyces bayanus hybrid, Saccharomyces pastorianus. It is closely related to the CWP2 gene and produces a small protein associated with the budding scar, known as cwp1p.

References 

Proteins
Saccharomyces cerevisiae genes